In computer science, the Floyd–Warshall algorithm (also known as Floyd's algorithm, the Roy–Warshall algorithm, the Roy–Floyd algorithm, or the WFI algorithm) is an algorithm for finding shortest paths in a directed weighted graph with positive or negative edge weights (but with no negative cycles). A single execution of the algorithm will find the lengths (summed weights) of shortest paths between all pairs of vertices. Although it does not return details of the paths themselves, it is possible to reconstruct the paths with simple modifications to the algorithm. Versions of the algorithm can also be used for finding the transitive closure of a relation , or (in connection with the Schulze voting system) widest paths between all pairs of vertices in a weighted graph.

History and naming
The Floyd–Warshall algorithm is an example of dynamic programming, and was published in its currently recognized form by Robert Floyd in 1962.  However, it is essentially the same as algorithms previously published by Bernard Roy in 1959 and also by Stephen Warshall in 1962 for finding the transitive closure of a graph, and is closely related to Kleene's algorithm (published in 1956) for converting a deterministic finite automaton into a regular expression. The modern formulation of the algorithm as three nested for-loops was first described by Peter Ingerman, also in 1962.

Algorithm
The Floyd–Warshall algorithm compares all possible paths through the graph between each pair of vertices. It is able to do this with  comparisons in a graph, even though there may be up to  edges in the graph, and every combination of edges is tested.  It does so by incrementally improving an estimate on the shortest path between two vertices, until the estimate is optimal.

Consider a graph  with vertices  numbered 1 through . By definition, this is the value , which we will find recursively.

Observe that  must be less than or equal to : we have more flexibility if we are allowed to use the vertex . This path can be decomposed as:

And of course, these must be the shortest such paths, otherwise we could further decrease the length. In other words, we have arrived at the recursive formula:
 
 
 .
Meanwhile, the base case is given by
 

These formulas are the heart of the Floyd–Warshall algorithm. This process continues until , and we have found the shortest path for all  pairs using any intermediate vertices. Pseudocode for this basic version follows.

Pseudocode

 let dist be a |V| × |V| array of minimum distances initialized to ∞ (infinity)
 for each edge (u, v) do
     dist[u][v] ← w(u, v)  // The weight of the edge (u, v)
 for each vertex v do
     dist[v][v] ← 0
 for k from 1 to |V|
     for i from 1 to |V|
         for j from 1 to |V|
             if dist[i][j] > dist[i][k] + dist[k][j] 
                 dist[i][j] ← dist[i][k] + dist[k][j]
             end if

Example
The algorithm above is executed on the graph on the left below:

At , paths that go through the vertex 1 are found: in particular, the path [2,1,3] is found, replacing the path [2,3] which has fewer edges but is longer (in terms of weight). At , paths going through the vertices {1,2} are found. The red and blue boxes show how the path [4,2,1,3] is assembled from the two known paths [4,2] and [2,1,3] encountered in previous iterations, with 2 in the intersection. The path [4,2,3] is not considered, because [2,1,3] is the shortest path encountered so far from 2 to 3. At , paths going through the vertices {1,2,3} are found.

Behavior with negative cycles

A negative cycle is a cycle whose edges sum to a negative value. For numerically meaningful output, the Floyd–Warshall algorithm assumes that there are no negative cycles. Nevertheless, if there are negative cycles, the Floyd–Warshall algorithm can be used to detect them. The intuition is as follows:

 The Floyd–Warshall algorithm iteratively revises path lengths between all pairs of vertices , including where ;
 Initially, the length of the path  is zero;
 A path  can only improve upon this if it has length less than zero, i.e. denotes a negative cycle;

Hence, to detect negative cycles using the Floyd–Warshall algorithm, one can inspect the diagonal of the path matrix, and the presence of a negative number indicates that the graph contains at least one negative cycle. To avoid overflow/underflow problems one should check for negative numbers on the diagonal of the path matrix within the inner for loop of the algorithm. Obviously, in an undirected graph a negative edge creates a negative cycle  (i.e., a closed walk) involving its incident vertices. Considering all edges of the above example graph as undirected, e.g. the vertex sequence 4 – 2 – 4 is a cycle with weight sum −2.

Path reconstruction

The Floyd–Warshall algorithm typically only provides the lengths of the paths between all pairs of vertices. With simple modifications, it is possible to create a method to reconstruct the actual path between any two endpoint vertices. While one may be inclined to store the actual path from each vertex to each other vertex, this is not necessary, and in fact, is very costly in terms of memory. Instead, the shortest-path tree can be calculated for each node in  time using  memory to store each tree which allows us to efficiently reconstruct a path from any two connected vertices.

Pseudocode  
 let next be a  array of vertex indices initialized to null
 
 procedure FloydWarshallWithPathReconstruction() is
     for each edge (u, v) do
         dist[u][v] ← w(u, v)  // The weight of the edge (u, v)
         next[u][v] ← v
     for each vertex v do
         dist[v][v] ← 0
         next[v][v] ← v
     for k from 1 to |V| do // standard Floyd-Warshall implementation
         for i from 1 to |V|
             for j from 1 to |V|
                 if dist[i][j] > dist[i][k] + dist[k][j] then
                     dist[i][j] ← dist[i][k] + dist[k][j]
                     next[i][j] ← next[i][k]

 procedure Path(u, v)
     if next[u][v] = null then
         return []
     path ← [u]
     while u ≠ v
         u ← next[u][v]
         path.append(u)
     return path

Time analysis

Let  be , the number of vertices. To find all  of 
 (for all  and ) from those of
 requires  operations. Since we begin with
.

Applications and generalizations
The Floyd–Warshall algorithm can be used to solve the following problems, among others:
 Shortest paths in directed graphs (Floyd's algorithm).
 Transitive closure of directed graphs (Warshall's algorithm). In Warshall's original formulation of the algorithm, the graph is unweighted and represented by a Boolean adjacency matrix. Then the addition operation is replaced by logical conjunction (AND) and the minimum operation by logical disjunction (OR).
 Finding a regular expression denoting the regular language accepted by a finite automaton (Kleene's algorithm, a closely related generalization of the Floyd–Warshall algorithm)
 Inversion of real matrices (Gauss–Jordan algorithm) 
 Optimal routing. In this application one is interested in finding the path with the maximum flow between two vertices. This means that, rather than taking minima as in the pseudocode above, one instead takes maxima. The edge weights represent fixed constraints on flow. Path weights represent bottlenecks; so the addition operation above is replaced by the minimum operation.
 Fast computation of Pathfinder networks.
 Widest paths/Maximum bandwidth paths
 Computing canonical form of difference bound matrices (DBMs)
 Computing the similarity between graphs
 Transitive closure in AND/OR/threshold graphs.

Implementations
Implementations are available for many programming languages.
 For C++, in the boost::graph library
 For C#, at QuickGraph
 For C#, at QuickGraphPCL (A fork of QuickGraph with better compatibility with projects using Portable Class Libraries.)
 For Java, in the Apache Commons Graph library
 For JavaScript, in the Cytoscape library
 For Julia, in the Graphs.jl package
 For MATLAB, in the Matlab_bgl package
 For Perl, in the Graph module
 For Python, in the SciPy library (module scipy.sparse.csgraph) or NetworkX library
 For R, in packages e1071 and Rfast

Comparison with other shortest path algorithms
The Floyd–Warshall algorithm is a good choice for computing paths between all pairs of vertices in dense graphs, in which most or all pairs of vertices are connected by edges. For sparse graphs with negative edges but no negative cycles, Johnson's algorithm can be used, with the same asymptotic running time as the repeated Dijkstra approach.

There are also known algorithms using fast matrix multiplication to speed up all-pairs shortest path computation in dense graphs, but these typically make extra assumptions on the edge weights (such as requiring them to be small integers). In addition, because of the high constant factors in their running time, they would only provide a speedup over the Floyd–Warshall algorithm for very large graphs.

References

External links

 Interactive animation of the Floyd–Warshall algorithm
 Interactive animation of the Floyd–Warshall algorithm (Technical University of Munich)

Graph algorithms
Routing algorithms
Polynomial-time problems
Articles with example pseudocode
Dynamic programming
Graph distance